Illusionism may refer to

 Illusionism (art)
 Illusionism (philosophy)
 Illusionism (consciousness)

See also 
 Illusion (disambiguation)